Season twenty-seven of Dancing with the Stars premiered on September 24, 2018, on the ABC network.

On November 19, radio personality Bobby Bones and Sharna Burgess were crowned the champions, while Disney Channel star Milo Manheim and Witney Carson finished in second place, actress Evanna Lynch and Keo Motsepe finished in third place, and social media personality Alexis Ren and Alan Bersten finished in fourth.

Cast

Couples
The thirteen professional dancers were revealed on Good Morning America on August 28, 2018. The ten professionals from last season returned, along with Cheryl Burke and Valentin Chmerkovskiy, both of whom last competed in season 25. Troupe dancer Brandon Armstrong made his debut in the pro lineup. Nancy McKeon was announced as the first celebrity competing for the season, partnered with Chmerkovskiy. On September 12, the rest of the cast was revealed on Good Morning America. The dance troupe for season 27 consisted of season 26 troupe members Artur Adamski, Hayley Erbert, Britt Stewart, and Morgan Larson; along with newcomer Vladislav Kvartin.

Hosts and judges
Tom Bergeron and Erin Andrews returned as hosts, while Carrie Ann Inaba, Len Goodman, and Bruno Tonioli returned as judges.

Scoring charts

Notes

 : This was the lowest score of the week.
 : This was the highest score of the week.
 :  This couple finished in first place.
 :  This couple finished in second place.
 :  This couple finished in third place.
 :  This couple finished in fourth place.
 :  This contestant was in the bottom five after the first night's performance.
 :  This couple was eliminated.

Highest and lowest scoring performances
The best and worst performances in each dance according to the judges' 30-point scale are as follows:

Couples' highest and lowest scoring dances
Scores are based upon a potential 30-point maximum.

Weekly scores
Individual judges' scores in the charts below (given in parentheses) are listed in this order from left to right: Carrie Ann Inaba, Len Goodman, Bruno Tonioli.

Week 1: First Dances
On the first night, couples danced the cha-cha-cha, foxtrot, jive, quickstep, or salsa. Couples are listed in the order they performed.

On the second night, the bottom five couples were given a chance to dance again, in the same style as the first night, but with new music and choreography. 

Night 1

Night 2

Week 2: New York City Night / Vegas Night
The couples performanced two different unlearned dances that paid tribute to the sights and sounds of New York City and Las Vegas. The Argentine tango, Charleston, jazz, paso doble, samba, tango, and waltz were introduced. Couples are listed in the order they performed.

Night 1 - New York City

Night 2 - Las Vegas

Week 3: Most Memorable Year Night
The couples performed one unlearned dance to celebrate the most memorable year of their lives. Contemporary, rumba and Viennese waltz were introduced. Couples are listed in the order they performed.

Week 4: Trio Night
The couples performed a trio dance with a past celebrity contestant or a personal acquaintance. Couples are listed in the order they performed.

Week 5: Disney Night
The couples performed one unlearned dance to a song from a Disney film. Couples are listed in the order they performed. There was no elimination.

Week 6: Halloween Night
The couples performed one unlearned dance to a Halloween-themed song. Couples are listed in the order they performed.

Week 7: Country Night
The couples performed one unlearned dance and a team dance to country songs. Couples are listed in the order they performed. Two couples were sent home at the end of the night in a double elimination.

Week 8: Semifinals
The couples performed an unlearned dance dedicated to a meaningful person in their life. Afterward, the couples performed their week 1 dance styles to a new song that was coached by one of the three judges. Couples are listed in the order they performed. Two couples were sent home at the end of the night in a double elimination.

Week 9: Finals
The couples performed their favorite dance of the season and a freestyle routine. Couples are listed in the order they performed.

Dance chart 
The celebrities and professional partners danced one of these routines for each corresponding week:
 Week 1 (First Dances): One unlearned dance
 Week 2 (Night 1, New York City): One unlearned dance
 Week 2 (Night 2, Las Vegas): One unlearned dance
 Week 3 (Most Memorable Year Night): One unlearned dance
 Week 4 (Trio Night): One unlearned dance
 Week 5 (Disney Night): One unlearned dance
 Week 6 (Halloween Night): One unlearned dance
 Week 7 (Country Night): One unlearned dance & team dance
 Week 8 (Semifinals): One unlearned dance & judge's choice
 Week 9 (Finals): Favorite dance & freestyle

Notes

 :  This was the highest scoring dance of the week.
 :  This was the lowest scoring dance of the week.
 :  This couple performed, but were not scored.

Ratings

References

External links

Dancing with the Stars (American TV series)
2018 American television seasons